Hans Peter Geerdes (born 16 March 1964), professionally known by his stage name H.P. Baxxter, is a German musician who is best known as the lead vocalist of the German techno band Scooter. He founded Scooter with his friend Rick J. Jordan in 1993.

Biography

Early life
Baxxter studied accountancy for one term in Hanover, but he ultimately completed a scholarship in Birmingham, England, as a mechanic.

Music career
In 1985, Baxxter founded the band Celebrate the Nun, together with Rick J. Jordan and his sister Britt Maxime. Their single "Will You Be There" from the album Meanwhile reached No. 2 on the Autobahn Dance/Club Play chart on 23 June 1990, and the single "She's a Secretary"/"Strange" reached No. 12 on Dance/Club Play chart on 8 December of the same year.

In 1993, former Celebrate the Nun members joined Baxxter's cousin Orion (Ferris Bueller) to form a remix team known as The Loop, which ceased in 1998.

In December 1993, Baxxter, along with Celebrate the Nun member Rick J. Jordan and Baxxter's cousin and The Loop member Ferris Bueller, formed the group Scooter.

Baxxter joined Guildo Horn, Jeanette Biedermann, Sylvia Kollek and Tobias Künzel on the German jury for Eurovision Song Contest 2009. In 2010, he was announced to be the official German representative for the 2010 IIHF World Championship.

Baxxter was one of the judges on the German version of the X Factor in season 3.

Personal life
Baxxter is an automotive enthusiast. Many music videos for Scooter include old models, such as a 1961 Jaguar Mark 2 and a 1973 Jaguar E-Type V12. He owns and collects many old British cars. He is an Anglophile, having grown up consuming English television and music, and claims to "have always liked the dignified English way of life". On 6 May 2006, he married his girlfriend Simone Mostert. In 2011, H.P. and Simone got divorced one day before The Stadium Techno Inferno.

Television
In 1998, he was participated on Alarm für Cobra 11 in the episode "Tödlicher Ruhm" (Deadly Fame) as himself

References

External links

H.P. Baxxter Quotes
 

East Frisians
English-language singers from Germany
German male singers
German electronic musicians
German rappers
People from Leer
1964 births
Living people